Hsiao-Lan Kuo (Guo Xiaolan; 1915–2006) was a Chinese-American mathematician and meteorologist. He was a recipient of the Carl-Gustaf Rossby Research Medal.

Career
Born in Mancheng County, Hebei Province on February 7, 1915, Kuo obtained his B.Sc. from Tsinghua University (1937), a M.Sc. from Zhejiang University (1942, under advisor Coching Chu), and a Ph.D. from the University of Chicago (1948, advisor Carl-Gustaf Rossby).

From 1949 to 1961, Kuo worked as a research associate, later a senior specialist, and finally the project director on the Hurricane Project at the Massachusetts Institute of Technology (MIT). He was Professor Emeritus at the Department of Geophysical Sciences at the University of Chicago.

Kuo was an academician of Academia Sinica (1988 election).

Works
Kuo developed important mathematical tools to describe the complex circulation patterns of atmospheric activity. He helped to mathematically model the birth of a tropical cyclone (hurricane). Kuo's work is an important part of the theoretical foundation for modern meteorology. He is considered as a member of the Chicago School of Meteorology, which started from Carl-Gustaf Rossby.

For this reason, in 1970, Kuo was awarded the Carl-Gustaf Rossby Research Medal from the American Meteorological Society (AMS), which is the highest honor for atmospheric science.

The Rayleigh-Kuo theorem or Rayleigh-Kuo Criterion, a necessary condition for barotropically unstable fluid, is named after him.

References

External links
 Obituary notice: Hsiao-Lan Kuo, meteorologist, 1915-2006 
 Britannica: Hsiao-lan Kuo (Chinese-American meteorologist) 
 A memorial of professor Guo Xiaolan 
 Chinese Obituary: 郭晓岚院士去世 
  郭晓岚教授对大气科学的杰出贡献 (Kuo's outstanding contributions to meteorology)  

American meteorologists
1915 births
2006 deaths
Carl-Gustaf Rossby Research Medal recipients
Zhejiang University alumni
University of Chicago alumni
Massachusetts Institute of Technology faculty
Chinese emigrants to the United States
Members of Academia Sinica
Tsinghua University alumni